Native cherry is a common name for several Australian plant species with edible fruit;
Exocarpos cupressiformis
Exocarpos sparteus